The Aspromonte or  is an indigenous breed of domestic goat from the mountain massif of the Aspromonte, in the province of Reggio Calabria in Calabria in southern Italy, for which it is named. It is raised only in the province of Reggio Calabria, mainly in the Aspromonte, in the Altipiano dello Zomaro (Zomaro plateau) to the north-east, and in the Ionian coastal areas of the province, and particularly in areas of Grecanic culture. While the breed is thought to originate on the Aspromonte, it may have been influenced by the various other goat breeds, including the Abyssinian goat, the Maltese, and a type known as "Tibetan" with long silky hair, whose importation to Calabria in the early twentieth century is well documented.

The Aspromontana is one of the forty-three autochthonous Italian goat breeds of limited distribution for which a herdbook is kept by the Associazione Nazionale della Pastorizia, the Italian national association of sheep- and goat-breeders. At the end of 2013 the registered population was variously reported as 27,164 and as 26,249.

Characteristics

The head is small, with a straight profile. Both sexes usually have tassels and are bearded and horned. The horns are flattened and lyre-shaped, and have a tuft of hair between them. The ears are horizontal or erect; in a small percentage of cases the crop-eared mutation is seen. The abdomen is fairly large for the size of the animal, with a straight back, and a moderately sloping, developed rump). The udder of the female, with medium-sized teats, are firmly attached, similar to those of sheep, and only rarely pyriform. The hooves are long, with thick, dark soles. Males have larger heads and horns, stronger limbs, and coarser hair.

The coat is long, with a Cashmere-type undercoat, and usually ruddy, but there are various colour variant classifications, including red-and-white, black-and-white, grey, brown, brown-and-red and particoloured. The skin is described as "fine and elastic", and usually matches the coat, though may range from pink to grey-black.

The Aspromonte's annual fertility rate is (i.e. bred females who give birth) is 98%, with average age of first parturition of 15 months. Reproductive productivity is 148–159%, depending upon how calculated.

Breeding goals are to improve prolificity (twinning rate) and the yield and quality of meat and milk. Some conformational defects, such as crop ear, are tolerated, while others, such as a short coat or a coarse or heavy head, are not.

Uses

The Aspromonte is a dual-purpose goat, raised both for meat and for milk. It is a frugal and hardy breed, and has an important role in vegetation management and maintenance of the mountain pastures of the Aspromonte massif, thus contributing to fire prevention, soil stability and the conservation of local biodiversity and the ecosystem.

The minimum milk yield of Aspromonte nannies is 120 litres in 150 days for primiparous, 130 L in 160 days for secondiparous and 180 L in 210 days for pluriparous animals.  Reported averages are, respectively, 140 L in 150 days, 150 L in 160 days, and 220 L in 210 days. The milk averages 3.95% fat, 3.57% protein and 4.63% lactose, and is used to make local cheeses of many kinds. These include, among others, caciotta, cacioricotta, canestrato dell'Aspromonte, caprino dell'Aspromonte, caprino di Limina, giuncata di capra, musulupu dell'Aspromonte, mixed-milk cheeses such as caciocavallo di Ciminà, and various kinds of fresh, baked, smoked or salted ricotta. Many of these have PAT status as traditional products of the area.

Consumption of goat's meat, particularly of adult nannies, is notably higher in the province of Reggio Calabria than anywhere else in Italy. Calabrian goat's meat has PAT status, and there are numerous traditional local goat's-meat dishes.

References

Goat breeds
Dairy goat breeds
Goat breeds originating in Italy